The 1969 World 600, the 10th running of the event, was a NASCAR Grand National Series event that took place on May 25, 1969, at Charlotte Motor Speedway in Concord, North Carolina.

Background
The race was held at Charlotte Motor Speedway, a  asphalt quad-oval in Concord, North Carolina. The track, which opened in 1960, was built by Bruton Smith and Curtis Turner.

Qualifying

Race report
Four hundred laps were raced on the paved oval track spanning . After nearly four hours and thirty minutes of racing, LeeRoy Yarbrough defeated Donnie Allison by two laps in front of 75000 spectators. The 16-lap difference between 2nd place finisher Donnie Allison and 3rd place finisher James Hylton was another notable feature of this event. Five cautions would be waved for 45 laps along with 13 lead changes among eight different drivers. LeeRoy Yarbrough would lead the race from lap 162 through lap 400; putting on a very strong performance to win the race.

There were 44 drivers in the race; racing for a total of $132,100 ($ when considering inflation). Ed Negre would get the last-place finish in Don Tarr's 1967 Chevrolet due to a transmission problem on the second lap. Don Tarr scored his best career finish of 6th place. There was a 16-lap difference between 2nd-place finisher Donnie Allison and 3rd-place finisher James Hylton; showing the spectators that those two drivers did not have a similar set of racing skills.

Pearson's car rode the guardrail on a lap 13 crash. His car came back on the inside of the racetrack but while riding the guardrail Pearson hit a flag pole. Dave Marcis would have a long career ahead of him after leading the laps in this race. However, this would be the final race for Gerald Chamberlain and Larry Hess.

Eleven notable crew chiefs: Cotton Owens, Dick Hutcherson, Glen Wood, Banjo Matthews, Jim Vandiver, Dale Inman and Harry Hyde.

Timeline
Section reference:
 Start of race: Cale Yarborough had the pole position to begin the event.
 Lap 2: Ed Negre's vehicle developed transmission problems.
 Lap 4: LeeRoy Yarbrough took over the lead from Cale Yarborough; John Keeney had a terminal crash.
 Lap 13: David Pearson had a terminal crash.
 Lap 15: The radiator on Bobby Allison's vehicle developed serious issues.
 Lap 30: Paul Goldsmith took over the lead from LeeRoy Yarborough.
 Lap 34: The sway bar on Henley Gray's video became dangerously loose.
 Lap 38: James Hylton took over the lead from Paul Goldsmith.
 Lap 40: Paul Goldsmith took over the lead from James Hylton.
 Lap 42: Bobby Isaac took over the lead from Paul Goldsmith.
 Lap 48: Dave Marcis took over the lead from Bobby Isaac; the carburetor on Richard Brickhouse's vehicle suddenly caught on fire.
 Lap 54: Richard Petty took over the lead from Dave Marcis.
 Lap 57: The wiring on Gerald Chamberlain's vehicle suddenly became a problem.
 Lap 81: Dub Simpson managed to lose the rear end of his vehicle.
 Lap 104: LeeRoy Yarbrough took over the lead from Richard Petty.
 Lap 106: Richard Petty took over the lead from LeeRoy Yarbrough.
 Lap 108: Wendell Scott fell out with engine failure.
 Lap 110: Roy Mayne fell out with engine failure.
 Lap 122: Larry Hess fell out with engine failure.
 Lap 135: Bill Champion fell out with engine failure.
 Lap 139: Frank Warren managed to overheat his racing vehicle.
 Lap 150: John Sears fell out with engine failure.
 Lap 151: LeeRoy Yarbrough took over the lead from Richard Petty.
 Lap 153: Neil Castles had a terminal crash.
 Lap 158: Bobby Isaac took over the lead from LeeRoy Yarbrough.
 Lap 162: LeeRoy Yarbrough took over the lead from Bobby Isaac.
 Lap 272: Dave Marcis fell out with engine failure.
 Lap 303: Sam McQuagg fell out with engine failure.
 Lap 307: An incident involving a vehicle's hub forced Cale Yarborough out of the race.
 Lap 308: Buddy Arrington fell out with engine failure.
 Lap 336: Richard Petty fell out with engine failure.
 Lap 347: Buddy Baker fell out with engine failure.
 Lap 367: Friday Hassler fell out with engine failure.
 Lap 374: Bobby Isaac fell out with engine failure.
 Finish: LeeRoy Yarbrough was the official winner of the event.

Finishing order
Section reference:

 LeeRoy Yarbrough
 Donnie Allison
 James Hylton
 G.C. Spencer
 Bobby Isaac
 Don Tarr
 Hoss Ellington
 Jabe Thomas
 Friday Hassler
 Elmo Langley
 Sonny Hutchins
 Buddy Young
 E.J. Trivette
 Roy Tyner
 J.D. McDuffie
 Buddy Baker
 Ed Hessert
 Bill Seifert
 Richard Petty
 Ben Arnold
 Cecil Gordon
 Buddy Arrington
 Cale Yarborough
 Earl Brooks
 Sam McQuagg
 Dave Marcis
 Paul Goldsmith
 Neil Castles
 John Sears
 Frank Warren
 Bill Champion
 Larry Hess
 Dick Brooks
 Roy Mayne
 Wendell Scott
 Dub Simpson
 Dick Johnson
 Gerald Chamberlain
 Richard Brickhouse
 Henley Gray
 Bobby Allison
 David Pearson
 John Kenney
 Ed Negre

References

World 600
World 600
NASCAR races at Charlotte Motor Speedway